Stamnodes is a genus of moths in the family Geometridae first described by Achille Guenée in 1858.

Species
Stamnodes affiliata Pearsall, 1911
Stamnodes albiapicata Grossbeck, 1910
Stamnodes animata (Pearsall, 1906)
Stamnodes annellata (Hulst, 1887)
Stamnodes apollo Cassino, 1920
Stamnodes artemis Rindge, 1958
Stamnodes blackmorei Swett, 1915
Stamnodes cassinoi Swett, 1917
Stamnodes coenonymphata (Hulst, 1900)
Stamnodes danilovi (Erschov, 1877)
Stamnodes deceptiva Barnes & McDunnough, 1918
Stamnodes delicata (Grossbeck, 1908)
Stamnodes depeculata Lederer, 1870
Stamnodes eldridgensis Swett, 1917
Stamnodes fervefactaria (Grote, 1881)
Stamnodes formosata (Strecker, 1878)
Stamnodes franckata (Pearsall, 1909)
Stamnodes gibbicostata (Walker, 1862)
Stamnodes lampra Rindge, 1958
Stamnodes marinata W. S. Wright, 1920
Stamnodes marmorata Packard, 1871
Stamnodes mendocinoensis Dyar, 1923
Stamnodes modocata W. S. Wright, 1920
Stamnodes pauperaria (Eversmann, 1848)
Stamnodes reckseckeri Pearsall, 1910
Stamnodes seiferti (Neumoegen, 1882)
Stamnodes splendorata Pearsall, 1909
Stamnodes tessellata (Packard, 1874)
Stamnodes topazata (Strecker, 1899)
Stamnodes triangularia (Bartlett-Calvert, 1891)
Stamnodes ululata Pearsall, 1912
Stamnodes uniformata (Berg, 1877)
Stamnodes unilinea (Walker, 1867)
Stamnodes watsoni (Cassino, 1920)

References

Stamnodini